"(Rap) Superstar" is a single by American hip hop group Cypress Hill. The song was released as the lead single from the group's fifth album, Skull & Bones. It was originally released as a double A-side with its rock counterpart on February 29, 2000 in the UK. An individual release was available starting sometime in April.

Music video
The music video for the song begins with a young man walking down the street, kicking a can. Walking up to a puddle, the man finds a ticket with "Rap Superstar" written on it. A fun house suddenly pops up and the man hands the ticket to Sen Dog, then enters. In one of the rooms, the man sees a group of women who dress him up in a suit. In another room, the man listens to a speech being given by B-Real, dressed as Fidel Castro. In another room, TV screens show rappers Eminem and Noreaga giving testimonies about the rap business. At the video's climax, the man goes to a performance by the band before being chased by the crowd. As the man exits the fun house, an explosion occurs and the man smiles.

Charts

Notes

A  "(Rap) Superstar" and "(Rock) Superstar" were released together as a double A-side single in the United Kingdom.

References

Cypress Hill songs
Columbia Records singles
2000 singles
2000 songs
Songs written by DJ Muggs
Songs written by B-Real
Song recordings produced by DJ Muggs